Elvin Cafarguliyev (also spelled Jafarguliyev; , born on 26 October 2000) is an Azerbaijani footballer who plays as a defender for Qarabağ FK in the Azerbaijan Premier League and the Azerbaijan U21.

Club career
On 10 December 2017, Cəfərquliyev made his debut Azerbaijan Cup for Keşla against Kapaz.

He signed a contract with Qarabağ FK in 2018. In summer 2019, Sumgayit FK announced the signing of Cəfərquliyev on one-year long loan. On 17 August 2019, he made his debut in the Azerbaijan Premier League for Sumgayit against Gabala.

He made his debut for Qarabağ on 11 September 2020, in the Azerbaijan Premier League match against Keşla.

On 18 August 2020, Cəfərquliyev made his European debut against Sileks in the UEFA Champions League first qualifying round.

International career
He made his debut for Azerbaijan national football team on 30 March 2021 in a World Cup qualifier against Serbia.

International goals

Honours
Keşla
 Azerbaijan Cup: 2017–18

References

External links
 
 Elvin Cafarguliyev at www.uefa.com
 

2000 births
Living people
Association football midfielders
Azerbaijani footballers
Sumgayit FK players
Qarabağ FK players
Azerbaijan Premier League players
Azerbaijan under-21 international footballers
Azerbaijan youth international footballers
Azerbaijan international footballers